Bloomingdale is an unincorporated census-designated place in Hillsborough County, Florida, United States. The population was 22,711 at the 2010 census. The ZIP Codes serving the community are 33511 (which is addressed to Brandon) and 33596 (which is addressed to Valrico).

History
Bloomingdale was settled some time before 1850 by John Vickers, John Carney, and others. Carney was killed on April 17, 1856, by Seminoles during the Third Seminole War. Bloomingdale School was founded in 1884, which in 1897 became a teacher's institute, training an average of 54 teachers at a time from as far north as Gainesville and as far south as Miami-Dade County. In 1890 the railway was routed through Brandon, and Bloomingdale began to decline as businessmen like D.J. Galvin, who owned a feed store on the property that is now Mulrennan Middle School, moved to Brandon for access to all the benefits provided by the railroad. In 1910, the post office closed. In 1920, the school closed and the students were sent to Brandon instead. The community declined, or at best remained stable until the 1960s, when it became a bedroom community for Tampa.

Geography
Bloomingdale is located in east-central Hillsborough County at  (27.881904, -82.259919). It is bordered to the north by Brandon, to the northeast by Valrico, to the southeast by FishHawk, and to the southwest by Riverview.

The Alafia River forms the southern border of the CDP. Bell Shoals are some rapids on the river in Bloomingdale.

Demographics

As of the 2006–2008 American Community Survey estimates, there were 19,434 people, 6,590 households, and 5,697 families residing in the community. The racial makeup of the community was 88.12% White, 6.38% African American, 0.26% Native American, 2.24% Asian, 0.07% Pacific Islander, 1.12% from other races, and 1.80% from two or more races. Hispanic or Latino of any race were 6.93% of the population.

There were 6,590 households, out of which 43.7% had children under the age of 18 living with them, 74.2% were married couples living together, 10.5% had a female householder with no husband present, and 13.6% were non-families. 10.8% of all households were made up of individuals, and 3.3% had someone living alone who was 65 years of age or older.  The average household size was 3.03 and the average family size was 3.26.

In the community the age distribution of the population shows 31.4% under the age of 18, 6.2% from 18 to 24, 31.4% from 25 to 44, 25.4% from 45 to 64, and 5.5% who were 65 years of age or older.  The median age was 36 years. For every 100 females, there were 98.0 males.  For every 100 females age 18 and over, there were 94.4 males.

The median income for a household in the community was $68,911, and the median income for a family was $72,282 (these figures had risen to $87,366 and $94,723 respectively as of a 2007 estimate). Males had a median income of $50,217 versus $31,727 for females. The per capita income for the community was $26,552.  About 1.1% of families and 1.7% of the population were below the poverty line, including 5.0% of those under age 18 and 2.1% of those age 65 or over.

Education
Bloomingdale is served by Hillsborough County Schools. Bloomingdale High School is located within the community.

References

External links

Census-designated places in Hillsborough County, Florida
Census-designated places in Florida
Planned communities in Florida